The 2017–18 Northern Iowa Panthers men's basketball team represented the University of Northern Iowa during the 2017–18 NCAA Division I men's basketball season. The Panthers, led by 12th-year head coach Ben Jacobson, played their home games at the McLeod Center in Cedar Falls, Iowa as members of the Missouri Valley Conference. They finished the season 16–16, 7–11 in MVC play to finish three-way tie for seventh place. As the No. 7 seed in the MVC tournament, they defeated Evansville in the first round before losing to Loyola–Chicago in the quarterfinals.

Previous season 
The Panthers finished the 2016–17 season 14–16, 9–9 in MVC play to finish in a tie for third place. As the No. 3 seed in the MVC tournament, they lost to Missouri State in the quarterfinals.

Offseason

Departures

2017 recruiting class

2018 recruiting class

2019 recruiting class

Preseason 
In the conference's preseason poll, the Panthers were picked to finish in second place in the MVC and received eight first place votes. Senior forward Bennet Koch was named to the preseason All-MVC first team while senior forward Klint Carlson was named to the second team.

Roster

Schedule and results

|-
!colspan=9 style=|Exhibition

|-
!colspan=9 style=| Non-conference regular season

|-
!colspan=9 style=| Missouri Valley Conference regular season

|-
! colspan="9" style=|  Missouri Valley tournament

Panther Sports Network (PSN) Cedar Falls Utilities Ch. 15/HD415; KCRG-TV Ch. 9.2; WHO-DT Ch. 13.2; KGCW Ch. 26, Time Warner Cable KC Channel 324, (NBC Sports Chicago or NBCSC+)

References

Northern Iowa Panthers men's basketball seasons
Northern Iowa
Panth
Panth